Román Andrés Gastaldi (born 25 September 1989 in Devoto, Córdoba) is an Argentine decathlete. He competed at the 2011 Pan American Games in Guadalajara, Mexico and 2013 World Championships in Moscow, Russia.

Competition record

References

External links 
 All-athletics profile
 Guadalajara 2011 profile

1989 births
Living people
Argentine decathletes
Athletes from Buenos Aires
Athletes (track and field) at the 2011 Pan American Games
Pan American Games competitors for Argentina